William "Knucks" James (May 2, 1878 – June 1966) was an American baseball second baseman in the Negro leagues. He played from 1905 to 1918 with several teams.

James's wife Sadie traveled with him in 1914 when the Mohawk team traveled to Indianapolis and Chicago for a series of games.

References

External links

1878 births
1966 deaths
Bacharach Giants players
Brooklyn Royal Giants players
Cuban X-Giants players
Lincoln Giants players
Louisville White Sox (1914-1915) players
Schenectady Mohawk Giants players
Philadelphia Giants players
Baseball players from Norfolk, Virginia
Date of death missing
20th-century African-American people
Baseball infielders